Naig may refer to:

People
 Mike Naig (born 1978), American politician and farmer
 Neri Naig (born 1985), Filipina actress
 Naig Yusifov (1970–1992), Azerbaijani soldier posthumously awarded the title National Hero of Azerbaijan

Places
 Naig, Iran, a village in South Khorasan Province
 Naig Valley, a vale and hill torrent in Sindh, Pakistan

NAIG
 North American Indigenous Games